Federico Richter Fernandez-Prada O.F.M.  (February 14, 1922 – August 8, 2011) was a Peruvian Prelate of the Roman Catholic Church.

Federico Richter Fernandez-Prada was born in Huanta, Peru, ordained a priest on July 14, 1946 from the religious order of the Order of Friars Minor. He was appointed auxiliary bishop of the Archdiocese of Piura as well as titular bishop of Thucca in Numidia. Prada was appointed Coadjutor Archbishop of the Archdiocese of Ayacucho o Huamanga in 1975, succeeding as bishop on November 20, 1979. He would retire on May 23, 1991.

See also
Archdiocese of Piura
Archdiocese of Ayacucho o Huamanga
Order of Friars Minor

References

External links
Catholic-Hierarchy
Franciscan site

20th-century Roman Catholic bishops in Peru
21st-century Roman Catholic bishops in Peru
Peruvian Roman Catholic archbishops
1922 births
2011 deaths
Roman Catholic archbishops of Ayacucho
Roman Catholic bishops of Piura